Kochumon is a 1965 Indian Malayalam-language film, directed by K. Padmanabhan Nair and produced by Mamman Varghese. The film stars Prem Nazir, Sheela, Thikkurissy Sukumaran Nair and T. S. Muthaiah. It was released on 8 October 1965.

Plot

Cast
Prem Nazir as George
Sheela as Lilly
Thikkurissy Sukumaran Nair as Maalikayil Chackochan 
T. S. Muthaiah as Mathappan 
Mamman George as Johny 
Adoor Pankajam as Maathu
Ammu as Rosy 
C. R. Lakshmi as Achamma
Meena as Mary
Adoor Bhasi as Kunju Nair 
T. R. Omana as Annamma 
Kottayam Shantha as Meenakshi 
Nellikode Bhaskaran as Cheriyan 
Kedamangalam Ali as Kuttappan 
Haji Abdul Rahman as Priest

Soundtrack
The music was composed by Alleppey Usman and lyrics was written by P. J. Eezhakkadavu and P. Bhaskaran.

References

External links
 

1965 films
1960s Malayalam-language films